Sheep Impact is a 2010 Australian short film, starring Steven Seagal and Martin Copping that was made as an advertisement for Carlton & United Breweries. It was shot in Arizona and written and directed by Brendan Gibbons. It was brought about after two promotional commercials, "Snake" and "Sausage" were released on Australian television in late 2011 calling on Australians to submit their "wildest true story" to be made into a film with "Steven Seagal starring as you, playing the lead character". Steven Seagal played the role of 'Paul Wieland' with his best friend 'Craig' played by Martin Copping.

Plot
Two young men Paul Wieland and Craig are heading to a party when they run into some trouble. That trouble revolves around a sheep that Wieland does not want to see die.

See also
List of Australian films

References

External links
 

2010 films
2010 black comedy films
Australian black comedy films
Australian comedy short films
Films about sheep
2010 short films
2010 comedy films
2010s Australian films